Nathalie Dechy and Vera Zvonareva defeated Dinara Safina and Katarina Srebotnik in the final, 7–6(7–5), 7-5 to win the women's doubles title at the 2006 US Open.

Lisa Raymond and Samantha Stosur were the defending champions and first seed, but lost in the semifinals to Safina and Srebotnik.

Martina Navratilova made her final major appearance, marking the end of a 33-year career.

Seeds

Draw

Finals

Top half

Section 1

Section 2

Bottom half

Section 3

Section 4

References

External links
2006 US Open – Women's draws and results at the International Tennis Federation

Women's Doubles
US Open (tennis) by year – Women's doubles
2006 in women's tennis
2006 in American women's sports